The World Rapid Chess Championship is a chess tournament held to determine the world champion in chess played under rapid time controls. Prior to 2012, FIDE gave such recognition to a limited number of tournaments, with non-FIDE recognized tournaments annually naming a world rapid champion of their own. Since 2012, FIDE has held an annual joint rapid and blitz chess tournament and billed it as the World Rapid & Blitz Chess Championships. FIDE also holds the Women's World Rapid & Blitz Chess Championship. The current rapid world champion is grandmaster Magnus Carlsen. Tan Zhongyi from China is the current women's rapid world champion. Carlsen has won the event a record four times.

Time controls

The concept of rapid chess (then called "active chess") made its debut at a 1987 FIDE Congress meeting in Seville, Spain. During the World Active Chess Championship the following year, time controls were set at 30 minutes per player per game. In 1993, following his split from FIDE, world champion Garry Kasparov organized a slightly quicker version of active chess, dubbing it "rapid chess". The Professional Chess Association, Kasparov's answer to FIDE, subsequently organized two Grand Prix cycles of rapid chess before folding in 1996. Under rapid chess time controls, each player was allowed 25 minutes with an additional 10 seconds after each move. FIDE would re-use these time controls and the "rapid chess" moniker for the 2003 FIDE World Rapid Chess Championship, held in Cap d'Agde. During the World Cup 2013, these time controls were also used for the rapid tiebreak stages.

In 2012, FIDE inaugurated the World Rapid & Blitz Chess Championships. The current time controls for the rapid championship are set at 15 minutes per player, with a 10-second increment.

FIDE-recognized events

Prior to 2012, FIDE sporadically sanctioned a world rapid chess championship. The first official high-profile rapid match took place in 1987, when then-world champion Garry Kasparov defeated Nigel Short in the "London Docklands Speed Chess Challenge" at the London Hippodrome. Kasparov won the match with 4 wins, two losses, and no draws in six games.

1988 World Active Chess Championship

In 1988, FIDE organized the inaugural World Active Chess Championship, a 61-player rapid chess tournament in Mazatlan, Mexico hosted by the Mazatlan Hoteliers Association. Notable participants included:

 , 2715
 , 2625
 , 2595
 , 2585
 , 2570
 , 2570
 , 2550
 , 2545
 , 2535
 , 2530
 , 2530
 , 2455
 , 2450
 , 2320

The event was won by Anatoly Karpov, who edged out GM Viktor Gavrikov on tiebreak points after their 1st-place playoff ended in a 5–5 tie. Karpov was subsequently named the new "Active Chess Champion", winning a $40,000 cash prize in the process. Garry Kasparov, the current world champion, declined to participate in the event and derided the concept of an active chess champion afterwards - he was quoted as saying, "Active Chess? What does that make me, the Passive World Champion?". The political controversy surrounding the event and the naming of a separate "active chess champion" led to the parallel rapid championship being dropped for future years.

2001 FIDE World Cup of Rapid Chess

In 2001, the French Chess Federation organized the 16-player World Cup of Rapid Chess at Cannes, with support from FIDE. The tournament consisted of a round-robin stage (2 groups of eight players each), followed by a set of knockout matches to determine the winner. With the Melody Amber rapid chess tournament being held concurrently, the world's top players were split between attending both events. Nevertheless, the tournament attracted a strong field headlined by the No. 1-rated player in the world - despite the World Cup's status as an FIDE event, Kasparov's contract with the French Chess Federation led to his inclusion.

 
 , 2849
 , 2746
 , 2745
 , 2709
 , 2695
 , 2693
 , 2676
 , 2671
 , 2663
 , 2672
 , 2663
 , 2658
 , 2622
 , 2618
 , 2618
 , 2535

In group A, Kasparov's domination of his opponents was on display: he scored 5½/7 to finish in clear 1st place, 1½ points ahead of the rest of the field. Joining him in the top 4 were Bareev, Grischuk, and Judit Polgár, who beat out Peter Svidler in tiebreaks. In group B, Belgian grandmaster Mikhail Gurevich got off to a fast start with 3 wins in 4 games to finish atop the group with 5/7. Following him into the knockout stage were the two Frenchmen, Bacrot and Tkachiev, and Michael Adams.

Kasparov defeated Bareev in Game 2 of the final match to win the tournament. In the endgame, Kasparov and Bareev were left with a seemingly closed position - four pawns and a King apiece. However, the position of Kasparov's king gave him a slight advantage, and with only two seconds left on his clock, Bareev could not find the drawing line and was forced to resign.

FIDE World Rapid Chess Championship 2003

Looking to revive the World Rapid Chess Championship, FIDE gave official "world title" recognition to the 2003 rapid chess tournament held in Cap d'Agde, France. Hosted by the Caisse Centrale d'Activités Sociales des Electriciens et Gaziers de France (CCAS) on the Mediterranean coast, the 2003 tournament included eleven of the world's 12 top-ranked players along with five wild-cards. With an average rating of 2726 Elo points, the 2003 event was the strongest rapid chess tournament of all time up to that point. Included in the field were the reigning FIDE and Classical world chess champions, Ruslan Ponomariov and Vladimir Kramnik.

 , 2777
 , 2766
 , 2739
 , 2737
 , 2735
 , 2732
 , 2725
 , 2723
 , 2722
 , 2722
 , 2718
 , 2703
 , 2693
 , 2693
 , 2666
 , 2664

The field was divided into two groups of eight players each, from which eight players total would progress to the knockout stages; ties in standings were resolved by a sudden-death playoff. Vladimir Kramnik, Ruslan Ponomariov, and Etienne Bacrot scored 4½/7 to progress from Group A. Taking the final spot was Veselin Topalov, who defeated Boris Gelfand in a sudden-death playoff. In group B, Peter Svidler finished clear of the field with 5/7 to secure a spot in the quarterfinals; joining him were Alexander Grischuk, Viswanathan Anand, and Judit Polgar.

Kramnik, the reigning classical world champion and tournament's No. 1 seed, dispatched Polgár and Grischuk with little difficulty to reach the final. In the other half of the bracket, Viswanathan Anand defeated Peter Svidler in a sudden-death blitz game after three drawn games to join him. After Game 1 ended in a quiet 19-move draw, Anand chose to play for complications in Game 2 in the white side of a Sveshnikov Sicilian. Following an inaccuracy from Kramnik (17... a5? 18. Na3), Anand was able to use his two knights to infiltrate Kramnik's defence, eventually forcing a queen sac to win the game and the match.

World Rapid & Blitz Chess Championships (since 2012)

On May 31, 2012, FIDE announced the inaugural World Rapid & Blitz Championships, set to take place in Astana, Kazakhstan from July 1 to 11. The 2012 tournament consisted of a qualifying round, followed by the rapid and blitz events held consecutively over 5 days. In order to promote viewership, time controls were set at 15 minutes per player, rather than the pre-2012 standard of 25 minutes. The championship was originally structured as a 16-player round-robin tournament, set to coincide with the first release of FIDE's rapid and blitz ratings in July 2012; invited were the top 10 players in the FIDE ratings list, the three medalists of the qualification competition, and three wild-card nominees by the organization committee and FIDE.

The style has since been changed to a Swiss tournament with a field of over 100 grandmasters. The top three finishers in the standings are awarded gold, silver, and bronze medals respectively. Various methods of resolving ties have been used and the 2016 edition resulted in all three medallists tied on 11/15 points with the champion being determined by comparing the average rating of each player's opponents. From 2017 onwards, a tie-breaker match has been played in the event of  two or more players being tied on points for first place. Only two players may participate in this match, even where three or more players are tied for first place on points. This caused some controversy in the 2021 edition where four players finished at the top of the tournament each with a score of 9.5/13. A tie-break match for the gold and silver medals was held between Nodirbek Abdusattorov and Ian Nepomniachtchi due to having the highest Buchholz (Cut 1) scores of the four players. Magnus Carlsen, the defending champion, and Fabiano Caruana were therefore unable to participate in the tie-break match despite having the same score as the champion. Carlsen criticised this result as 'idiotic' and called for changes.

Editions and medallists
 Open

 Women

Other events

Frankfurt/Mainz World Rapid Chess Championship

Starting in 1994, the Chess Classic was an annual series of tournaments hosted by the Chess Tigers in Mainz, Germany. The brainchild of Hans-Walter Schmitt, the Chess Classic featured top-ranked players playing rapid and FischeRandom chess games against computers as well as each other. The main event of the classic was the Grenkeleasing Rapid World Championship (formerly Fujitsu-Siemens), a tournament generally considered as the traditional rapid chess championship in the absence of an annual FIDE-recognized championship. Indian grandmaster Viswanathan Anand holds the record for most championship wins, having won the event 11 times in 15 years.

From 1996 to 1998, the Rapid Chess Championship at Frankfurt was organized as a double-round robin, followed by a match between the 1st and 2nd-place finishers for the championship. With the addition of Karpov to the field in 1999, the format was temporarily changed to a pure round-robin, with the 1st-place finisher winning the championship. The following year the field was expanded further to include all ten of the top 10-rated Grandmasters in the world, and was dubbed a Category 21 tournament with an average Elo rating of 2767.

In 2001 the event moved to Mainz, and shifted from a round-robin to a matchplay format - the defending champion Vishwanathan Anand defended his title in an eight-game match against the winner of the previous year's Ordix Open, the open rapid tournament. In 2007, with Anand still the rapid champion after six successful title defenses, the event reverted to a double-round robin tournament, with the top two finishers in the semi-finals advancing to the finals. In a homage to the Masters Tournament, the winner of the championship is traditionally awarded a winner's black jacket.

In 2010, the event's final year, the Open GRENKE Rapid Championship featured a field of over 700 players. Shortly afterwards, the Chess Tigers withdrew financial backing for the event, due in part to the effects of the  financial crisis of 2007–2008.

1 Blitz tiebreaks used to settle the outcome.

2002 Eurotel World Chess Trophy

Presented under the auspices of Online World Chess, the 2002 EuroTel Knockout Tournament was a 32-player single-elimination tournament hosted in Prague from 27 April to 5 May 2002. 14 of the world's top 15 players were in attendance, including the reigning world champion Vladimir Kramnik and the world's No. 1-ranked player Garry Kasparov. A notable omission from the field was reigning FIDE World Champion Ruslan Ponomariov. At stake was a share of the €500,000 prize fund, the largest for any chess event hosted in the Czech Republic, and the EuroTel Trophy. The finalists of the tournament were determined by a series of knock-out matches, with each match consisting of two games played at rapid time controls (25 minutes per player). Ties were broken by two blitz games, followed by a sudden-death Armageddon game.

 , 2838
 , 2809
 , 2752
 , 2745
 , 2744
 , 2724
 , 2718
 , 2711
 , 2710
 , 2707
 , 2704
 , 2702
 , 2698
 , 2690
 , 2688
 , 2677
 , 2676
 , 2673
 , 2659
 , 2652
 , 2647
 , 2642
 , 2641
 , 2633
 , 2631
 , 2624
 , 2618
 , 2616
 , 2610
 , 2606
 , 2596
 , 2594

The surprise of the tournament was Anatoly Karpov, who put together an impressive run with wins against Short, Kramnik, Morozevich, and Shirov to reach the finals. In the other half of the bracket, the No. 1 seed Kasparov was upset by Vasyl Ivanchuk in a sudden-death game after the rapid and blitz games did not produce a winner; Ivanchuk would subsequently lose to Indian grandmaster Viswanathan Anand in the semifinals, bowing out with a loss in the second blitz tiebreak game after both rapid games ended in a draw.

In the final, Anand defeated Karpov in Game 1 with White to take a 1–0 lead; Anand maneuvered his light-squared bishop to slowly gain an advantage throughout the game, before 54... a5? gave the Indian a winning advantage. In Game 2, Karpov pressed but was unable to crack Anand's Semi-Slav Defence, leading to a 34-move draw.

ACP World Rapid Cup

Starting in 2007, the Association of Chess Professionals (ACP) sponsored an annual event billed as the ACP World Rapid Cup. The 1st edition of the event was a 16-player knockout tournament, jointly organized by the Pivdenny Bank of Ukraine and the ACP and held in Odessa, Ukraine at the Hotel Londonskaya from 4 January to 8 January 2007. The brainchild of Pivdenny Bank chairman and ACP president Vadim Morokhovsky, the tournament included the top finishers in each year's ACP Tour, a system in which participating players were ranked based on their performances in several chess tournaments held around the world. The remaining participants were chosen on a wild-card basis at the organizers' discretion. From 2007 to 2010, the tournament was held on an annual basis, with the 5th edition of the cup held in 2013. Despite the ACP Cup's status as a non-FIDE event, FIDE President Kirsan Ilyumzhinov was present at the inaugural edition of the tournament and took part in the opening ceremony. A subsequent agreement between FIDE and the ACP ensured that ACP would be able to use the title "World" when promoting and referring to the tournament.

Time controls were set at 20 minutes per player, with an increment of five seconds. Each match consisted of two rapid games, with the winner progressing to the next round. Ties were resolved by two blitz games, followed by a sudden-death Armageddon game. The final match initially consisted of four rapid games, with the same tiebreaks; in 2013, the final was shortened back to two rapid games.

1 Armageddon game used to settle the outcome.

See also
 World Blitz Chess Championship
 Fast chess

Notes

References 

Rapid
 
rapid